The Wood Screw Pump is a low-lift axial-flow drainage pump designed by A. Baldwin Wood in 1913 to cope with the drainage problems of New Orleans. Wood's extremely efficient pumps replaced less efficient pumps in the city's drainage system, prior to which the city had experienced chronic flooding problems, bringing diseases such as malaria and yellow fever together with contamination of drinking water supplies. The pumps are driven by  synchronous Allis-Chalmers and General Electric motors, built in the early 1900s. They were designed to lift a large volume of water into outfall canals from which the water flowed into Lake Pontchartrain. 

Having proved their operational efficiency in New Orleans, people around the world wanted Wood to make pumps for them, especially the Netherlands. Wood rejected all countries that asked as he refused to leave Louisiana. Until the arrival of Hurricane Katrina, the pumps had kept much of New Orleans from experiencing major inundation for nearly 100 years.

References

Pumps
Hydraulics